Yaroslav Kotlyarov (born 19 November 1997 in Yenakiieve, Donetsk Oblast, Ukraine) is a Ukrainian football goalkeeper who plays for Metalurh Zaporizhya.

Club career
Kotlyarov is a product of the FC Olimpik Sportive Academy and was promoted to the main squad team in April 2014. He made his debut on 18 May 2014 in a match against FC Avanhard Kramatorsk in the Ukrainian First League.

With Olimpik he won the 2013–14 Ukrainian First League and got promotion to the Ukrainian Premier League.

References

External links
Profile at Official FFU website (Ukr)

1997 births
Living people
People from Yenakiieve
Ukrainian footballers
FC Olimpik Donetsk players
Ukrainian Premier League players
Association football goalkeepers
FC Helios Kharkiv players
FC Sudnobudivnyk Mykolaiv (2016) players
FC Kremin Kremenchuk players
FC Volyn Lutsk players
FC Metalurh Zaporizhzhia players
Sportspeople from Donetsk Oblast